Sulkhara (Sulkhari) is a rural locality (a settlement) in Kizhinginsky District, Republic of Buryatia, Russia. The population was 646 as of 2010. There are 12 streets.

Geography 
Sulkhara is located 24 km southeast of Kizhinga (the district's administrative centre) by road. Bakhlayta is the nearest rural locality.

References 

Rural localities in Kizhinginsky District